Scabbard and Blade (S&B) is a college military honor society founded at the University of Wisconsin in 1904.  Although membership is open to Reserve Officers' Training Corps (ROTC) cadets and midshipmen of all military services, the society is modeled after the U.S. Army and its chapters are called companies and are organized into regiments in order of their establishment. It was founded as a men's organization, and is now a co-educational society. The Junior Program has opened membership to Junior Reserve Officers' Training Corps (JROTC) cadets and midshipmen as well, having to uphold the same standards as their collegiate counterparts.

S&B is a member of the Association of College Honor Societies, a coordinating and certification organization for collegiate honor societies.

The national headquarters is located at Stillwater, Oklahoma.

History

S&B was founded during the school year 1904-1905 at the University of Wisconsin by five senior officers in the cadet corps. The five founders of S&B were Leo M. Cook, Albert W. Foster, Victor R. Griggs, Charles A. Taylor, and Harold K. Weld.

The society has become inactive on two occasions. These were during World War I and World War II, when there were no courses of military training in universities and colleges because every able-bodied man was in the service. The first national convention was held on May 11, 1906, at Madison, Wisconsin, and was attended by representatives of the four companies which then comprised the society. Conventions were held annually until April 1916, after which no convention was held until February 1920. This inactivity was due to World War I. Following the 1920 meeting, conventions were held every two years. This practice continued until 1940 when war interrupted the progress of the Society and all companies were directed by General Order to bring their affairs to a close. In November 1947, after seventy companies had been reactivated, a convention was called.

Membership

Companies must all have an active unit at their respective areas in order to request a charter. Additionally, each company must have an advisor to oversee operations within the company. There are also several other positions that a company must fill out to maintain an active company.

Active companies are also required to pay $60 USD for the initial fee. Annual dues consist of a flat $40 followed by an additional $10 per active member of the company.

Honors society companies' dues, required positions, all differ from ROTC companies even though they serve as the honor society for ROTC companies. The honors society company also must be chartered separately from the ROTC company unlike JROTC whose honor society comes with the original company.

Required positions

The following positions must be filled in an active company:
Company Advisor: Faculty or school staff member
Company Captain (Commander): (J)ROTC student
Company 1st Lieutenant (Vice Commander): (J)ROTC student
Company 2nd Lieutenant (Finance Officer): (J)ROTC student
Company First Sergeant (Executive Officer): (J)ROTC student

JROTC

There are two different levels of membership for a JROTC Company: Junior Membership and Distinguished Junior Membership.

Members must additionally meet at a minimum of three times throughout the school year: the beginning, middle, and end. Companies are allowed to meet more than the required amount as long as it is approved by the company advisor. The company must also fill out and file appropriate paperwork to National Headquarters in order to retain membership in the organization.

Program mission

"This program aims to support the planning and accomplishments of JROTC students’ goals and aspirations. Our objective is to help expose these members to opportunities, mentors, and resources that assist them in accomplishing their goals and developing the Five Star qualities."

Junior Membership

Junior Membership is open to active JROTC students. Students must consistently exemplify the Five Star Qualities and have taken a pledge to gain more information about gaining a college education. Additionally, students must be in good standing with both the school and the JROTC company.

Distinguished Junior Membership

Distinguished Junior Membership is only open to JROTC students who are currently active Junior Members in S&B. Junior Members must either currently be in, or about to be in, their Junior or Senior year. Either one of the following qualifications must also be met before being allowed membership:
Junior Members must be ranked in the top 20% of their academic year class (commander's order of merit listing)
Junior Members must achieve and maintain a Grade Point Average (GPA) set by the discretion of the JROTC unit commander. The minimum requirement must be a 3.0 or higher.
The JROTC unit commander is given discretion over which of the above requirements Junior Members must complete.

ROTC

Program mission

"This program focuses on exposing these future leaders to a wide variety of resources that are based on the Five Star qualities. We do not intend to teach a member a specific curriculum on 'how to lead' — but instead,  we encourage members to diversify themselves in knowledge and become the officer they want to be."

Senior Membership

Senior Membership is similar to active JROTC membership. However, candidates are ineligible during their first college semester and must at least be in their second semester or later in order to become a member. Like active JROTC members, ROTC members must also consistently demonstrates the Five Star qualities.

Candidates must also receive a letter of nomination from their unit's ROTC commander. This letter can be used to tighten the original requirements in order to improve the quality of the organization should the commander deem necessary.

In tandem, candidates must be in good standing with their school, as well as have taken a pledge to become a commissioned officer in the United States Armed Forces.

Honor society

In order for an Honor Society to be chartered, aside from the standard requirements, the requesting Company must receive approval from all involved ROTC unit commanders.

Membership

Candidates seeking membership must first be an active ROTC student. Additionally, they must either be, or about to be, in their Junior or Senior year. Candidates must additionally rank in the top 20% of their unit commander's Order of Merit Listing or achieve a 3.5 GPA. Unlike the previous two Companies, there are only two positions that must be filled to maintain an active Company:
Company Captain (Commander): Honor Society Member
Company 1st Lieutenant (Finance Officer/Executive Officer): Honor Society Member
A candidate can be in a position for both the ROTC Company and the Honor Society Company, however a candidate cannot hold both honor society company positions (Company Captain and Company 1st Lieutenant).

Chartering an honor society company requires an initial $60 fee. Another $40 must be paid annually to retain an active Company.

Objectives and goals

Preamble

"Believing that military service is an obligation of citizenship, and that the greater opportunities afforded college men and women for the study of military science place upon them certain responsibilities as citizens, we cadet officers in various colleges and universities conferring baccalaureate degrees, do form this society and adopt this constitution in order to united in closer relationship the military departments of American universities and colleges; to preserve and develop the essential qualities of good and efficient officers; to prepare ourselves as educated men and women to take a more active part and to have greater influence in the military affairs of the communities in which we may reside; and above all to spread intelligent information concerning the military requirements of our country."

Mission

"We are dedicated to developing aspiring and current military officers that emulate the Five Star qualities while fostering strong joint-service relationships."

Vision

"Our members will redefine the standard of excellence for all military officers."

Five Stars

Honor

Loyalty
Efficiency
Courage
Obedience
Good Fellowship

Leadership

Human Behavior and Teamwork
Negotiation and Conflict Resolution
Critical Thinking and Strategy
Communication
Delegation Strategy

Professionalism

Ethics and Standards
Goal Setting and Execution
Time Management
Resource Management
Attitude and Image

Officership

Mentorship
Selflessness
Service (Community and Nation)
Military Standards (Uniform Code of Military Justice & Operating Instructions)
Military History

Unity

Joint Education
Joint Camaraderie
Joint Understanding
Joint Integration

External links
 Scabbard and Blade official website
 Scabbard and Blade at Association of College Honor Societies

References

Association of College Honor Societies
Student organizations established in 1904
ROTC programs in the United States
University of Wisconsin–Madison
Payne County, Oklahoma
Former members of Professional Fraternity Association
1904 establishments in Wisconsin
Professional military fraternities and sororities in the United States